One Night in Eden is a live concert recording by Sarah Brightman, inspired by her Eden album. The premiere concert held in Johannesburg, South Africa was recorded in 1999 and has been released on DVD and VHS.

Track listing 
 "Introduction"
 "Baïlèro"
 "In Paradisum"
 "Eden"
 "So Many Things"
 "Who Wants to Live Forever"
 "Anytime, Anywhere"
 "Lascia Ch'io Pianga"
 "Nella Fantasia"
 "Nessun Dorma"
 "Dive/Captain Nemo"
 "La Mer"
 "Il Mio Cuore Va"
 "Only An Ocean Away"
 "First of May"
 "Phantom Overture & Little Lotte"
 "Wishing You Were Somehow Here Again"
 "Music of the Night"
 "Deliver Me"
 "Time to Say Goodbye"

Certifications

References

External links 
 

Albums produced by Frank Peterson
1999 live albums
Sarah Brightman albums
1999 video albums
Live video albums